Gaines Ruger Donoho (December 21, 1857 – January 28, 1916) was an American painter.

Biography

Early life
Gaines Ruger Donoho was born on December 21, 1857, in Church Hill, Mississippi. He grew up on his father Robert's plantation in Church Hill, Mississippi, until the elder Donoho was killed during the American Civil War. One of his mother's relatives, General Thomas H. Ruger (1833–1907), had them moved to New England with the rest of her family. He was trained as a painter at the Art Students League of New York in New York City and spent eight years in Paris.

Career
He practised as an Impressionist, Symbolist and Tonalist painter in Manhattan. In 1891, he moved to East Hampton, where he continued to paint. He is best known for his landscape and garden paintings, some of which are reminiscent of Claude Monet's Giverney garden paintings. Additionally, he also did some drawings.

Some of his work is exhibited at the Metropolitan Museum of Art in Manhattan, Brooklyn Museum in Brooklyn, New York City and at the Mississippi Museum of Art in Jackson, Mississippi.

John Lavery (1856–1941) painted his portrait.

Personal life
He was married to Matilda Ackley Donoho. He died on January 28, 1916, in New York City. After Donoho's death, Matilda Donoho sold the Long Island property to the Childe Hassams - good friends.

Selected paintings
Wind Flowers (Metropolitan Museum of Art).
East Hampton Garden (Long Island Museum of American Art, History, and Carriages).
La Marcellerie (Brooklyn Museum).

Secondary source
Ronald G. Pisano, G. Ruger Donoho (1857–1916): A Retrospective Exhibition (Hirschl & Adler Galleries, 1977, 21 pages).
René Paul Barilleaux, G. Ruger Donoho: A Painter's Path (Jackson, Mississippi: Univ. Press of Mississippi, 1995).

References

External links
Memorial exhibition, an exhibition catalog of the artist.

People from Jefferson County, Mississippi
People from Manhattan
People from East Hampton (town), New York
Art Students League of New York alumni
19th-century American painters
American male painters
1857 births
1916 deaths
20th-century American painters
Painters from Mississippi
Painters from New York City
19th-century American male artists
20th-century American male artists